Kakamega Waste To Energy Plant, also Kakamega Solid Waste Power Station, is a  solid waste-fired thermal power plant under development in Kenya. VR Holding AB, a Swedish energy company, has been awarded the concession contract to design, finance, construct, operate and maintain the power station. As raw material, the power station is designed to use solid waste gathered from homes, businesses and industries in Kakamega County and neighboring counties in south-western Kenya, including the counties of Bungoma, Busia, Homa Bay, Trans Nzoia, Vihiga and others.

Location
The power plant is under construction in the village of Mung'ang'a, in Mumias East sub-county, Kakamega County, in southwestern Kenya.

The county leases the acreage to the developer, under a 25 year lease agreement.

Overview
The power station is rated at 10 megawatts. An estimated 800 tonnes of solid waste is expected to be incinerated every 24 hours to produce heat. The heat will be used to boil water, producing steam. The steam will be used to turn electric generators to produce electricity. The energy generated will be sold to the Kenyan national electricity transmitter and distributor, Kenya Power and Lighting Company (Kenya Power), for distribution in Kakamega and neighboring counties.

The solid waste to supply the plant will be sourced from the counties in southwestern Kenya, as listed in this reference.

Ownership
The power station is owned and under development by VR Holding AB, an enterprise based in Bastad, Sweden.

Construction costs and timeline
The cost of construction has been quoted as US$53 million. Once construction starts, it is expected to take 9 months to commercial commissioning.

Associated benefits
This plant offers a "sustainable solution" to the disposal of solid waste, which is an increasing problem in the region. The plant will avail cheaper electric power to Kakamega County, estimated by some at 50 percent of current market rates.The developer of the power plant will build a community health centre adjacent to the power station as part of the developer's CSR program. It is estimated that the project will provide over 1,000 jobs during its construction, operations and supply chain processes.

See also

 List of power stations in Kenya
 Divo Biomass Power Station
 Sfax Waste To Methane Gas Project
 Dandora Waste to Energy Power Station
 Pomona Waste To Energy Power Station

References

External links
 Kakamega Gets A KSh8 Billion Waste to Energy Factory As of 2 March 2022.

Power stations in Kenya
Kakamega County
Proposed energy infrastructure
Buildings and structures in Kenya